Tengasu is an uninhabited islet of Funafuti, Tuvalu.

See also

 Desert island
 List of islands

References

Uninhabited islands of Tuvalu
Pacific islands claimed under the Guano Islands Act
Funafuti